Wright Lafate Anderson (born April 14, 1947) is an American football coach.  He served as the head football coach at Elon University from 1982 to 1983, compiling a record of 14–6.

In 1984, Anderson left Elon to accept a post as assistant coach of the Oklahoma Outlaws football team.

Head coaching record

References

1947 births
Living people
American football defensive backs
American football halfbacks
East Carolina Pirates football coaches
Elon Phoenix football coaches
Elon Phoenix football players
Illinois Fighting Illini football coaches
Missouri Tigers football coaches
United States Football League coaches
Wake Forest Demon Deacons football coaches
Wichita State Shockers football coaches
People from Burgaw, North Carolina
Sportspeople from Wilmington, North Carolina
Players of American football from North Carolina